This is a list of fossiliferous stratigraphic units in Bolivia.



List of fossiliferous stratigraphic units

See also 

 
 Gomphothere fossils in Bolivia
 South American land mammal ages
 List of fossiliferous stratigraphic units in Paraguay
 List of fossiliferous stratigraphic units in Peru

References

Bibliography 
 
 

Cajones Formation
 

Casira Formation
 

Cerdas beds
 

Honda Group
 
 
 
 

Lacayani fauna
 

Mesón Group
 

Los Monos Formation
 

Ñuapua Formation
 

La Puerta Formation
 

Puncoviscana Formation
 

Quehua Formation
 

Salla Formation
 
 
 

Santa Lucía Formation
 
 
 
 
 
 
 
 
 

Tarija Formation
 

Toro Toro Formation
 
 

Umala Formation
 

Yecua & Petaca Formations

Further reading 
 

Mesozoic
 L. Branisa. 1968. Hallazgo del amonite Neolobites en la Caliza Miraflores y de huellas de dinosaurios en la formación El Molino y su significado para la determinación de la edad del "Grupo Puca" [Discovery of the ammonite Neolobites in the Miraflores Limestone and of dinosaur footprints in the El Molino Formation and their significance for the determination of the age of the "Puca Group"]. Boletín de Instituto Boliviano del Petróleo 8(1):16-29
 M. Gayet, L. G. Marshall, and T. Sempere. 1991. The Mesozoic and Paleocene vertebrates of Bolivia and their stratigraphic context: a review. In R. Suarez-Soruco (ed.), Fosiles y Facies de Bolivia. Volumen 1—Vertebrados. Revista Técnica de YPFB 12(3-4):393-433

Paleozoic
 F. G. Acenolaza. 1980. Aportes a la paleontologia del Ordovicico Argentino. I. Merlinia farouxi nov. sp. (Trilobita - Asaphidae) de Azul Pampa, Provincia de Jujuy. Acta Geologica Lilloana 15(2):49-54
 C. Babin and L. Branisa. 1987. Ribeiria, Peelrophon y otros molluscos del Ordovíco de Bolivia. 4˚ Congreso Latinoamericano de Paleontología 1:119-129
 J. L. Benedetto. 2013. Upper Ordovician Brachiopods from the San Benito Formation, Cordillera del Tunari, Bolivia. Ameghiniana 50(4):418-428
 J. L. Benedetto. 2007. New Upper Cambrian-Tremadoc rhynchonelliformean brachiopods from northwestern Argentina: evolutionary trends and early diversification of plectorthoideans in the Andean Gondwana. Journal of Paleontology 81(2):261-285
 L. Branisa. 1965. Los fosiles guias de Bolivia: I. Paleozoico. Boletin de Servicio Geologico de Bolivia. La Paz, Bolivia 6:1-282
 G. D. Edgecombe and L. Ramskold. 1994. Earliest Devonian phacopide trilobites from central Bolivia. Paläontologische Zeitschrift 68(3/4):397-410
 D. Edwards, E. M. Morel, F. Paredes, D. B. Ganuza, and A. Zuniga. 2001. Plant assemblages from the Silurian of southern Bolivia and their palaeogeographic significance. Botanical Journal of the Linnean Society 135:229-250
 N. Eldredge and L. Branisa. 1980. Calmoniid trilobites of the Lower Devonian Scaphiocoelia Zone of Bolivia, with remarks on related species. Bulletin of the American Museum of Natural History 165(2):181-289
 C. C. Emig and Z. Herrera. 2006. Dignomia munsterii (Brachiopoda, Lingulata) from the Ordovician of Bolivia, with redescription of the genus. Geodiversitas 28(2):227-237
 B.-D. Erdtmann, B. Weber, H.-P. Schultze and S. Egenhoff. 2000. A possible agnathan plate from the lower Arenig (Lower Ordovician) of South Bolivia. Journal of Vertebrate Paleontology 20(2):394-399
 C. J. Fischer. 1969. Deux bellerophontacées nouveaux de Bolive. Bulletin de Societé géologique, France 7:605-608
 P. Y. Gagnier, S. Turner, L. Friman, M. Suarez-Riglos, and P. Janvier. 1988. The Devonian vertebrate and mollusc fauna from Seripona (Dept. of Chiquisaca, Bolivia). Neues Jahrbuch für Geologie und Paläontologie, Abhandlungen 176(2):269-297
 V. Havlicek and L. Branisa. 1980. Ordovician brachiopods of Bolivia: Succession of assemblages, climate control, affinity to Anglo-French and Bohemian provinces. Rozpravy Ceskoslovenske Akademie Ved. Rada Matematickych a Prirodnich Ved. Academia Praha, Prague, Czechoslovakia 90(1):1-54
 R. Iannuzzi, M. Guerra-Sommer, E. Diaz-Martinez and G.W. Grader. 1997. Presenca do genero Glossopteris no Neopermiano da Bolivia. Revista Universidade Guarulhos - Geociencias II (no. especial) 1-225
 P. E. Isaacson. 1977. Devonian stratigraphy and brachiopod paleontology of Bolivia. part A: Orthida and Strophomenida. Palaeontographica Abteilung A 155(5-6):133-192
 G. Laubacher, A. J. Boucot, and J. Gray. 1982. Additions to Silurian stratigraphy, lithofacies, biogeography and paleontology of Bolivia and southern Peru. Journal of Paleontology 56(5):1138-1170
 B. Lefebvre and P. R. Racheboeuf. 2007. First report of mitrate Stylophorans (Echinodermata) in the Lower Devonian of Bolivia. Cuadernos del Museo Geominero (8)239-244
 C. Mitchell, E. D. Brussa, and J. Maletz. 2008. A mixed Isograptid-Didymograptid Graptolite assemblage from the Middle Ordovician of West Gondwana (NW Bolivia): implications for Graptolite Paleoecology. Journal of Paleontology 82(6):1114-1126
 B. Petriella and R. Suarez Soruco. 1989. Presencia de plantas terrestres, probablemente vosculares, en las formaciones Kirusillas y Tarabuco (Lampayano-Silurico Superior) de Bolivia. Revista Tecnica de YPFB 10:119-121
 R. E. Plotnick. 1999. Habitat of Llandoverian-Lochkovian eurypterids. In A. J. Boucot, J. D. Lawson (eds.), Paleocommunities - a case study from the Silurian and Lower Devonian 106-136
 A. Pradel, I. J. Sansom, P.-Y. Gagnier, R. Cespedes, and P. Janvier. 2007. The tail of the Ordovician fish Scabambaspis. Biology Letters 3:72-75
 A. Pribyl and J. Vanek. 1980. Ordovician trilobites of Bolivia. Rozpravy Ceskoslovenske Akademie Ved. Rada Matematickych a Prirodnich Ved. Academia Praha, Prague, Czechoslovakia 90(2):1-90
 U. Rehfeld and J. Mehl. 1989. Andinodesma radiata n. gen. n. sp., a grammysiid taxon from the Lower Devonian Catavi-Formation (Bolivia) and its autecological and phylogenetic implications. Paläontologische Zeitschrift 63(3/4):263-279
 T. M. Sánchez and C. Babin. 2005. Lower Ordovician bivalves from southern Bolivia: paleobiogeographic affinities. Ameghiniana 42(3):559-566
 T. M. Sanchez, B. Waisfeld, and J. L. Benedetto. 1991. Lithofacies, taphonomy, and brachiopod assemblages in the Silurian of western Argentina: A review of Malvinokaffric Realm communities. Journal of South American Earth Sciences 4(4):307-329
 R. Suarez Soruco. 1976. El sistema ordovicico en Bolivia. Revista Tecnica YPF Bolivia 5(2):111-123
 J. R. Thompson, W. I. Ausich, and L. Smith. 2013. Echinoderms from the Lower Devonian (Emsian) of Bolivia (Malvinokaffric Realm). Journal of Paleontology 87(1):166-175
 M. Toro and S. Fernandez. 1979. Los fosiles de la formacion Pircancha aflorante en Chilcayo, Provincio Mendez - Depto. Tarija. Revista de la Academia Nacional de Ciencas de Bolivia 163-169
 B. G. Waisfeld and T. M. Sanchez. 1993. Trilobites Siluricos de la Formacion Lipeon en el noroeste Argentino (Sierra de Zapla, Provincia de Jujuy). Ameghiniana 30(1):77-90
 R. Wolfart. 1968. Die Trilobiten aus dem Devon Boliviens und ihre Bedeutung fuer Stratigraphie und Tiergeographie. Beihefte zum Geologischen Jahrbuch 74:5-201
 G. D. Wood. 1997. The acritarch Proteolobus walli gen et sp. nov. from the Devonian Iquiri Formation of Bolivia: a possible coenobial alga. Micropaleontology 43(3):325-331

External links 
 Geologic map of Bolivia

.Bolivia
 
 
Fossil